The Samarkand electoral district was a constituency created for the 1917 Russian Constituent Assembly election. The electoral district covered the Samarkand Oblast. Four candidate lists contested the election in Samarkand; List 1 - Socialist-Revolutionaries, List 2 - Muslim Organizations of Samarkand Oblast, List 3 - Mensheviks and List 4 - United Oblast Progressive Bloc. List 1 and List 3 had an electoral alliance.

Results

References

Electoral districts of the Russian Constituent Assembly election, 1917